Matthias Gerung or, in older literature, Mathias Geron (c. 1500, Nördlingen – 1570, Lauingen), was a German painter and woodcut artist.

Biography
He was probably the son of a violinist known as "Shoemaker" Matthias (?–1521) and may have studied painting with Hans Leonhard Schäufelin. Earlier sources indicate that he also studied with Hans Burgkmair. In 1525, he moved to Lauingen in the Duchy of Pfalz-Neuburg. He then married Anna Reiser, who was likely the daughter of Matthes Reiser (?–c.1519); also a painter. Gerung may have moved there to take over his workshop. He and Anna had two sons, Ambrosius and Hans, who became a goldsmith.

The Bible had been started almost 100 years earlier and he added 117 illustrations. 
   
He appears once again in the tax lists for 1568, where he is also described as a constable and siegler (a type of notary).

His detailed panel paintings provide a wealth of information about life in 16th century Germany. In addition to his clearly attributable works, he is also believed to have created several satirical pieces that criticized the Catholic Church and the Papacy.

References

Further reading 
 Anja F. Eichler: Mathis Gerung (um 1500–1570): Die Gemälde, Peter Lang, 1993 
 Petra Roettig: Reformation als Apokalypse. Die Holzschnitte von Matthias Gerung im Codex germanicus 6592 der Bayerischen Staatsbibliothek in München, Peter Lang, 1991

External links 

 
 
 Detailed sections of the "Melancholy..."

1500s births
1570 deaths
German illustrators
16th-century German painters
People from Nördlingen